The 2016 Grand Prix Hassan II was a professional tennis tournament played on clay courts. It was the 32nd edition of the tournament and part of the 2016 ATP World Tour. It took place in Marrakesh, Morocco between 4 and 10 April 2016.

Singles main-draw entrants

Seeds 

 1 Rankings are as of March 21, 2016.

Other entrants 
The following players received wildcards into the singles main draw:
  Amine Ahouda
  Reda El Amrani
  Lamine Ouahab

The following players received entry from the qualifying draw:
  Lorenzo Giustino
  Máximo González
  Nikola Mektić
  Franko Škugor

Withdrawals 
Before the tournament
  Pablo Andújar →replaced by  Evgeny Donskoy 
  Aljaž Bedene →replaced by   Taro Daniel
  Ernests Gulbis →replaced by  Facundo Bagnis
  Martin Kližan →replaced by  Daniel Gimeno Traver
  Tommy Robredo →replaced by  Thiemo de Bakker
During the tournament
  Simone Bolelli

Doubles main-draw entrants

Seeds 

 Rankings are as of March 21, 2016.

Other entrants 
The following pairs received wildcards into the doubles main draw:
  Amine Ahouda /  Yassine Idmbarek
  Reda El Amrani /  Lamine Ouahab

Retirements
  Amine Ahouda

Champions

Singles 

  Federico Delbonis def.  Borna Ćorić, 6–2, 6–4

Doubles 

  Guillermo Durán /  Máximo González def.  Marin Draganja /  Aisam-ul-Haq Qureshi,  6–2, 3–6, [10–6]

References

External links